Miika Elomo (born April 21, 1977) is a Finnish former professional ice hockey player. He is currently the head coach of Storhamar Ishockey in the GET-ligaen.

Drafted 23rd overall by the Washington Capitals in the 1995 NHL Entry Draft, Elomo played just two games for the Capitals before he was traded in 2000 to the Calgary Flames, although he never played for the organization.  He returned to Finland for the Espoo Blues.  He retired after the 2004–05 season due to a wrist injury.

Career statistics

Regular season and playoffs

International

External links

1977 births
Sportspeople from Turku
Espoo Blues players
Finnish ice hockey coaches
Finnish ice hockey left wingers
HIFK (ice hockey) players
Living people
National Hockey League first-round draft picks
Portland Pirates players
Saint John Flames players
HC TPS players
Washington Capitals draft picks
Washington Capitals players
Finnish expatriate ice hockey players in the United States
Finnish expatriate ice hockey players in Canada